Ælfwold II (died 1058) was a Bishop of Sherborne in Dorset. He is venerated as a saint in the Catholic Church

Life

Little is known of Ælfwold apart from the information given by William of Malmesbury. He was at first a monk of Winchester, then was consecrated Bishop of Sherborne in 1045, succeeding his own brother Brithwine. His frugality of life served as a powerful contrast to the contemporary custom of riotous banqueting after the example of the Danish monarchs.

Ælfwold showed great devotion to Saint Swithun, his old patron of Winchester, and also to Saint Cuthbert, to whose shrine at Durham he made a pilgrimage. He died while singing the antiphon of Saint Cuthbert. He was in a sense the last Bishop of Sherborne, as after his death the see of Sherborne was united to that of Ramsbury in Wiltshire.

Ælfwold died in 1058. He is venerated as a saint in the Catholic Church and some Anglicans.

Notes

Citations

References

External links
 
 Catholic Online Saints and Angels: St Alfworld

1058 deaths
West Saxon saints
Bishops of Sherborne (ancient)
11th-century English Roman Catholic bishops
11th-century Christian saints
Year of birth unknown